Schade is a surname. Notable people with the surname include:

 Betty Schade, German-born American actress of the silent era
 Doris Schade, German actress
 Fritz Schade, German-born American actor of the silent era
 Hartmut Schade, German football player
 Henry A. Schade, United States Navy officer, naval architect, and professor
 Herbert Schade, West German athlete
 Horst Schade (1922–1968), West German football player
 Kevin Schade, German football player
 Louis F. Schade, American defense attorney for Henry Wirz at the Andersonville Trial
 Michael Schade, Canadian operatic tenor 
 Otto H. Schade, German-American television pioneer
 Robert Schade (1861–1912), American painter
 Victoria L. Schade, American politician

German-language surnames